Charles Sims may refer to:

 Charles Sims (painter) (1873–1928), British painter
 Charles Sims (mathematician) (1938–2017), American mathematician
 Charles Sims (aviator) (1899–1929), British World War I flying ace
 Charles Sims (American football) (born 1990), American football player
 Charles Sims (politician), in Toronto municipal elections from 1944 to 1952
 Charles Edward Sims (1925–1983), State Librarian of Kansas, 1973–1975
 Charles N. Sims (1835–1908), chancellor of Syracuse University
 Charles Sims (Surveyor General), Surveyor General of Ceylon, 1858–1865

See also
 Charles Simms (disambiguation)
 Charles Sim, an Australian cricketer